Ramani is a surname. Notable people with the surname include:
Balabhadrapatruni Ramani (1965), Indian litterateur, novelist, playwright, screenwriter, dialogue writer, and film critic
Giuseppe Ramani (1922–1973), Italian rower
K. Ramani (1916–2006), Indian politician
P. S. Ramani (1938), Indian neurosurgeon and writer
Priya Ramani, Indian journalist, writer, and editor
Radhakrishna Ramani (1901–1970), Malaysian lawyer
Raja V. Ramani, Indian-American scientist
Roja Ramani (born 1959), Indian actress
Sheila Ramani (1932–2015), Indian film actress

Hindustani-language surnames
Surnames of Hindustani origin